Randolph Harding (September 17, 1914 – March 3, 1996) was a Canadian politician.

Biography
Born in Silverton, British Columbia, Harding was a teacher and a member of the Silverton municipal council. He was elected as the Co-operative Commonwealth Federation candidate to the Legislative Assembly of British Columbia representing Kaslo-Slocan in 1945, and was re-elected in 1949, 1952, 1953, 1956, 1960, 1963 and 1966.

He was elected to the House of Commons of Canada in the 1968 federal election for the British Columbia riding of Kootenay West. A New Democrat, he was re-elected in 1972 and was defeated in 1974.

After leaving federal politics, Harding served as mayor of Silverton and received a long service award from the Union of British Columbia Municipalities.

Harding served in the Canadian Army during World War II.

References

External links

1914 births
1996 deaths
British Columbia Co-operative Commonwealth Federation MLAs
20th-century Canadian politicians
Members of the House of Commons of Canada from British Columbia
New Democratic Party MPs
Mayors of places in British Columbia